The Drake Jewel is a precious pendant given to Sir Francis Drake by Queen Elizabeth I to show her gratitude. The pendant is on display at the Victoria and Albert Museum in London.

History
Elizabeth I had the pendant created especially for Drake, by a renowned artisan, as a demonstration of gratitude. Drake's Jewel was created by Nicholas Hilliard and given to Drake before 1591, possibly to celebrate England's victory against the Spanish Armada in 1588. Drake was painted by Marcus Gheeraerts the Younger in 1591 and is shown wearing the jewel. Drake valued this pendant more than any of his other possessions.

After Drake's death in 1596 the jewel passed to Thomas Drake, his brother, and upon his death in 1637, to Thomas's widow. She sold the Jewel to her daughters for £3000 (about £ million today).

Description
On the front, the Jewel shows a cameo of an African man and a European woman. The reverse opens to show a painting of Elizabeth I and a phoenix.
The African man is wearing a paludamentum, the head gear of Roman generals and emperors. 
The portraits are watercolour on vellum, surrounded by rubies, diamonds and pearls.

Interpretation of images
The images on the jewel are open to interpretation;

Karen Dalton in The Black Emperor in the Drake Jewel and Elizabethan Imperial Imagery writes the jewel is a manifestation of the queen herself and of her imperial aspirations. The black emperor is Saturn the ruler of the Golden Age. The woman is the Virgin Astraea who will return Saturn to the throne.

Kevin Jackson in Chronicles of London writes that the European woman is Elizabeth I herself and the African man is enslaved.

David Shields at the Omohundro Institute writes that the images suggest that the joint effort of the African man and English woman will liberate the world from Spain.

The phoenix in the jewel is one of Elizabeth I's most used images, depicting peace, rebirth and virtue.

Gallery

References

Elizabeth I
Francis Drake